William Skipwith may refer to:

William Skipwith (fl.1348), MP for York (UK Parliament constituency)
William de Skipwith, important 15th century English judge.
William Skipwith (died 1547), represented Lincolnshire in 1529 and 1539
William Skipwith (died 1586), represented Lincolnshire in 1547
William Skipwith (died c.1595), MP for St. Albans
William Skipwith (died 1610), MP for Leicester and Leicestershire